The south Melanesian cuckooshrike (Coracina caledonica) is an uncommon species of bird in the cuckooshrike family.
It is found in New Caledonia, Bougainville Island, the Solomon Islands, and Vanuatu. The species is a large (32–37 cm) cuckoo-shrike with a long square tail and all over dark grey plumage. The eye of adults is yellow, whereas that of the juvenile is dark. 
Its natural habitats are subtropical or tropical moist lowland forests and subtropical or tropical moist montane forests.

Taxonomy

Subspecies 

 Coracina caledonica caledonica: New Caledonia
 Coracina caledonica thilenii: Vanuatu (Espíritu Santo, Malo and Malakula)
 Coracina caledonica seiuncta: Erromango (Vanuatu)
 Coracina caledonica lifuensis: Lifou (Loyalty Islands)

References

Doughty, Chris; Day, Nicolas & Plant, Andrew (1999) Birds of the Solomons, Vanuatu & New Caledonia, Christopher Helm, London

Coracina
Birds described in 1788
Taxa named by Johann Friedrich Gmelin
Taxonomy articles created by Polbot